Kadhim Shabib (born 1 July 1952) is an Iraqi former footballer. He competed in the men's tournament at the 1980 Summer Olympics. Shabib played for Iraq between 1976 and 1984.

References

External links
 

1952 births
Living people
Iraqi footballers
Iraq international footballers
Olympic footballers of Iraq
Footballers at the 1980 Summer Olympics
Place of birth missing (living people)
Association football goalkeepers